Mafia and Red Tomatoes is a 2014 Italian comedy film written and directed  by Giulio Manfredonia and starring Stefano Accorsi, and Sergio Rubini.

Plot

Cast 
  
Stefano Accorsi as Filippo
Sergio Rubini as Cosimo
Iaia Forte as  Azzurra
 Bebo Storti as  Dario
Debora Caprioglio  as  Jessica
 Maria Rosaria Russo as  Rossana
 Nicola Rignanese as  Valerio
 Massimo Cagnina as  Piero
 Giovanni Calcagno as  Piero
Giovanni Esposito as  Frullo
 Silvio Laviano as Salvo
 Michel Leroy as  Wuambua
Paolo De Vita as The Maresciallo
 Tommaso Ragno as  Nicola Sansone

See also 
 List of Italian films of 2014

References

External links 

2014 comedy films
Italian comedy films
Films about the Sicilian Mafia
2010s Italian films